Joaquim Miguel Leitão de Freitas Ferraz (born May 16, 1974), commonly known as Quim, is a Portuguese retired footballer who played as a striker.

Career
Ferraz began his career with Belenenses, making two league appearances in his debut season. In 1996, he moved to Paços de Ferreira, where he managed nine league goals from 31 games. The following year saw a brief spell at Gil Vicente before two seasons back at Belenenses. In July 1999, Ferraz moved on a Bosman transfer to Scottish side Dundee United, and made an instant impact by scoring a late debut winner against city rivals Dundee. Despite scoring three in his first four games, Ferraz fell out of form and finished the season with six from 28 appearances. In 2000, he moved back to Portugal with Marítimo and spent the next three seasons with Os Leões (The Lions), netting 13 goals from 41 league games.

Ferraz then moved clubs from season to season, spending 2003–04 with Penafiel and 2004–05 in China with Qingdao Zhongneng. In July 2005, he had the chance to return to Scottish football, but his trial with Dunfermline Athletic brought no contract. A move to Sporting Espinho followed, with a short spell at Marco, before his move to Maia.

See also
 Dundee United FC Season 1999-00

References

External links

1974 births
Living people
Portuguese footballers
Portuguese expatriate footballers
U.S.C. Paredes players
S.C. Lamego players
C.F. Os Belenenses players
F.C. Paços de Ferreira players
Gil Vicente F.C. players
Dundee United F.C. players
C.S. Marítimo players
F.C. Penafiel players
S.C. Espinho players
F.C. Marco players
F.C. Maia players
Moreirense F.C. players
A.D. Lousada players
Primeira Liga players
Scottish Premier League players
Chinese Super League players
Expatriate footballers in Scotland
Portuguese expatriate sportspeople in Scotland
Portuguese expatriate sportspeople in China
Expatriate footballers in China
Association football forwards